The 2012–13 Egyptian Premier League was the fifty-sixth season of the Egyptian Premier League since its establishment in 1948.

Following the 2013 Egyptian coup d'état on 3 July 2013, the season was suspended for security reasons, and a decision was reached to cancel the remainder of the season. Thus, the championship play-off and the relegation play-off were not played.

Clubs
A total of 64 clubs have played in the Egyptian Premier League from its inception in 1948–49 up to and including the 2012–13 season. But only two clubs have been members of the Egyptian Premier League for every season since its inception. They are Al Ahly and Zamalek. Most of this season's matches and the 2011–12 season have been postponed, because of the Egyptian revolution.

The following 18 clubs are competing in the Egyptian Premier League during the 2012–13 season.

League table

Group 1

Group 2 

1
1
Egypt
Cancelled association football competitions